is a Japanese television drama produced and aired in 2005 by NTV. The television show is based on the book of the same name by Gen Shiraiwa. The story follows the high school lives of Kiritani and Kusano as they attempt to make a shy Kotani into the most popular girl in school.

Plot overview

Introducing Nobuta 
Shuji Kiritani (Kazuya Kamenashi) is a very popular high school boy who is close to Mariko Uehara (Erika Toda), the most popular girl in school, but whom he does not actually love. Akira Kusano (Tomohisa Yamashita), his classmate, does not really have any friends - something that is attributed to the fact that he cannot read the atmosphere well, or rather, he chooses to ignore the atmosphere.
One day, a very shy girl, Nobuko Kotani (Maki Horikita) transfers to their school and is instantly picked on by a group of girls for her shyness. As a testimony to their youth, Shuji and Akira team up and decide to "produce" her, to make her popular. They nickname her "Nobuta".

Production of Nobuta
The various episodes deal with the pair's attempts at making Nobuko popular by making her more appealing. Amidst this, a mysterious person insidiously attempts to waylay all of Shuji and Akira's efforts. Fortunately, the trio always manages to pull through with ingenuity.

Finale
Shuji has to cope with his loss of popularity after he is caught out lying about Mariko and does not assist when a classmate is beaten up. Despite this, with the knowledge that his two true friends, Akira and Nobuko, will always be there for him, Shuji gets over it. There is also the revelation of Aoi, Kotani's first friend besides Shuji and Akira, as the mysterious antagonist of the story. In the final episode, Shuji discovers that he and his family must move out of Tokyo because of his father's job. Akira follows Shuji to his new hometown and surprises him by showing up at his new school. Nobuko is left alone in Tokyo, but she has overcome her shyness, and is finally able to smile. She also becomes popular among the other students, and is no longer bullied. The end of the drama sees all three characters being able to "live wherever [they] are", having learned the meaning of friendship and love.

Main characters
The drama centers around three main characters: Shuji Kiritani, Akira Kusano, and Nobuko Kotani.

Shūji Kiritani
 treats everything in life as a game, and thus, lives his life as a little white lie. He believes that by keeping up a "cool" facade, he can get to his goal without getting hurt. Because he chooses to hide his true self, Shuji is, on the inside, a truly lonely person. Although he does not like Mariko romantically, he has lunch with her every day in a bid to boost his popularity. He is only truly open to Akira and Nobuko, and considers the two as his only true friends. Always putting the feelings of others before himself, Shuji does not have the power to say "no". He always bottles up his own feelings, and never complains, that is the main reason why he lies.

Akira Kusano

Unlike Shuji,  is not popular. Constantly on a soy milk high, Akira always finds ways to get on Shujii's nerves. Despite this, they become good friends by the end of the series. With much money to dispense of, Akira finances most of their escapades. With no intention of following the footsteps of his father, the president of a company, Akira is a free spirit who would rather live his a life as a "dime in the street" and enjoy his youth. At one point in the story, it is revealed that Akira has affections for Nobuko. However, he does not pursue his feelings knowing that he will not be able to make her happy. He demonstrates a high prowess in karate easily beating up a bully and smashing through a set of tiles. Naturally forgiving, he is ready to forgive and forget, as long as it preserves his friendship with Shuji and Nobuko

Nobuko Kotani

 is painfully shy after initially being rejected by her stepfather at a young age. Following this, because she finds it difficult to relate to other students, she has been continuously bullied. Because of this, Nobuko is cynical. She believes that no matter where she is, or no matter how hard she tries, the world will still reject her. With Shuji and Akira's help and encouragement, she begins to open up more to others. Nobuko considers Shuji and Akira as the two people who are the most important to her. At the end of the series, she has finally gathered enough confidence to smile and continue socializing, even without them.

Minor characters

Mariko Uehara 
Nobuko's popular, basketball-playing girlfriend.  brings lunch for Nobuko every day, which shows her determination to have her as happy as all the other students. Although devastated when she finds out that Shuji does not reciprocate her feelings, she gradually comes to accept it. Although she is not officially a member of the Nobuta Producing team, she was indispensable in helping to produce Nobuko. At the end of the series, she has forged a friendship with Nobuko, and becomes her good friend after Shuji and Akira are gone.

Kasumi Aoi
The main antagonist of the story, though it is found out later in the series. Kasumi strives to destroy all of the trio's efforts, relishing the power of destroying someone's life and making others miserable. Because Nobuko considers Kasumi to be her first friend, nobody suspected her intentions until Shuji found out. Later on, Kasumi learns an important lesson about friendship and redemption, and is given a chance to turn over a new leaf at Nobuko's grace.

Credits

Cast 

 Kazuya Kamenashi - 
 Tomohisa Yamashita - 
 Maki Horikita -  (aka Nobuta)
 Erika Toda - 
 Rumi Hiiragi - Kasumi Aoi
 Takashi Ukaji - 
 Yuto Nakajima - 
 Yoshinori Okada - 
 Tomoya Ishii - 
 Katsumi Takahashi - 
 Mari Natsuki - 
 Fumiko Mizuta - 
 Shunsuke Daito - Taniguchi
 Honami Tajima - 
 Akiko - 
 Tomu Suetaka -

Staff
Hitoshi Iwamoto and Norika Sakuma - directors
Hidehiro Kawano - producer
Izumi Kizara - screenwriter

Episodes

Accolades
The Television Drama Academy Awards are held quarterly by the magazine, "The Television", and are based on the combined results of votes from the magazine readers, juries, and TV journalists.

Music
The theme song is "Seishun Amigo" by Shūji to Akira, a special group consisting of KAT-TUN's Kazuya Kamenashi and NewS' Tomohisa Yamashita, named after their drama counterparts. The song topped the Oricon charts in 2005, selling over 1 million copies and climbing to the top as the most successful single of the year.

References

External links
  

Japanese drama television series
2000s teen drama television series
2005 Japanese television series debuts
2005 Japanese television series endings
Nippon TV dramas
Television series about teenagers
Television shows based on Japanese novels